Antonio Vidaurre (1724, Madrid – 1780) was a Spanish painter, poet and writer.

1724 births
1780 deaths
Artists from Madrid
Spanish male writers
Writers from Madrid